The men's 1,500 metres at the 2012 IPC Athletics European Championships was held at Stadskanaal Stadium from 24–28 July.

Medalists
Results given by IPC Athletics.

Results

T11
Final

T13
Final

T20
Heats

Final

T46
Final

T54

See also
List of IPC world records in athletics

References

1,500 metres
1500 metres at the World Para Athletics European Championships